The Taipei Women's Championships is a defunct WTA Tour-affiliated women's tennis tournament played from 1986 to 1989 and from 1992 to 1994. It was held in Taipei, Taiwan and played on indoor carpet courts from 1986 to 1988, and on outdoor hard courts in 1989 and from 1992 to 1994. The 1980s tours were sponsored partly by Virginia Slims, and the 1990s events were sponsored by Kraft Foods and Procter & Gamble, the latter of which were named P&G Taiwan Women's Open or Taiwan Open in short. Anne Minter and Shi-Ting Wang were the most successful players at the tournament, each winning the singles competition twice.

History
The inaugural 1986 tournament was called the Chung Cheng Centennial Cup International Women's Tennis Championships and ran from October 6–12, 1986 to commemorate the centennial anniversary of Chiang Kai-shek's birth. The 32-draw singles and 16-draw doubles was played on carpet and the prize money for singles was $50,000. The winner of the singles tournament was Patricia Hy of Hong Kong who defeated Adriana Villagrán of Argentina in three sets. It was part of the WTA's 1986 Virginia Slims World Championship Series schedule. In 1989, the tournament switched to outdoor hard courts. There was no tournament in Taipei for 1990 or 1991.

From 1992 to 1994, the tournament was run on outdoor hard courts where it was sponsored by Kraft Foods and called the P&G Taiwan Women's Open. It was played at the Taipei City Courts, also known as Taipei Municipal Tennis Courts.

Past finals

Singles

Doubles

See also
 Taipei Grand Prix

References

External links
 WTA tournament archive

 
Hard court tennis tournaments
Carpet court tennis tournaments
Indoor tennis tournaments
Tennis tournaments in Taiwan
WTA Tour